Francesco di Paola Cassetta (12 August 1841 – 23 March 1919) was an Italian Cardinal of the Catholic Church who served as Prefect of the Sacred Congregation of the Council from 1914 until his death, and was elevated to the cardinalate in 1899.

Biography
Cassetta was born in Rome, and received the Sacrament of Confirmation on 1 September 1848. He studied at the Pontifical Roman Seminary, where he obtained his doctorates in theology (10 September 1863) and in canon and civil law (24 August 1866). Cassetta was ordained to the priesthood on 10 June 1865, and later raised to the rank of Domestic Prelate of His Holiness.

He was made referendary prelate of the Apostolic Signatura on 23 June 1878, auditor of the Vicar General of Rome on 3 April 1884, and later counselor of the Sacred Congregation for the Propagation of the Faith and of the Supreme Sacred Congregation of the Holy Office. He became a canon of the chapter of the Liberian Basilica on 23 November 1884.

On 2 December 1884, Cassetta was appointed Titular Bishop of Amathus in Palaestina by Pope Leo XIII. He received his episcopal consecration on the following 21 December, from Cardinal Lucido Parocchi, with Archbishop Pierre Dufal, CSC, and Bishop Guillaume-Marie Sourrieu serving as co-consecrators, in the church of San Luigi dei Francesi. Cassetta was later named Privy Almoner of His Holiness on 20 September 1887, and Titular Archbishop of Nicomedia on 25 November 1887. After becoming a canon of the chapter of St. Peter’s Basilica on 17 July 1889, he served as Vice-Gerent of Rome from 12 November 1895 to 19 June 1899. On 29 November 1895, Cassetta was appointed Titular Patriarch of Antioch.

Pope Leo created him Cardinal-Priest of San Crisogono in the consistory of 19 June 1899. He was given the titular church of Ss. Vito, Modesto e Crescenzia in commendam on 28 April 1901. Cardinal Cassetta served as Camerlengo of the Sacred College of Cardinals from 9 June 1902 to 22 June 1903, and he was one of the cardinal electors in the 1903 papal conclave, which selected Pope Pius X. He opted to become Cardinal Bishop of Sabina and perpetual abbot of Farfa on 27 March 1905, and was made Prefect of the Sacred Congregation of Studies on 3 June 1911. On the following 27 November, he was transferred to the suburbicarian see of Frascati. Pope Pius X appointed him Archivist of the Holy Roman Church on 3 January 1914. He held these ploasts until his resignation in 1917. Before participating in the conclave of 1914, Cassetta was named Prefect of the Sacred Congregation of the Council on 10 February of that same year. He then served as Apostolic Visitor to the Hospice of the Catechumens, and Commissioner for the apostolic visitation of the Italian dioceses.

Cardinal Cassetta died in Rome, at the age of 77. He is buried in the chapel of Pontifical Urbanian Athenaeum in the Campo Verano cemetery.

External links
Francesco di Paola Cardinal Cassetta
Catholic-Hierarchy

1841 births
1919 deaths
Italian archivists
20th-century Italian cardinals
Cardinal-bishops of Frascati
Cardinal-bishops of Sabina
19th-century Italian Roman Catholic titular archbishops
Members of the Sacred Congregation of the Council
Latin Patriarchs of Antioch
Cardinals created by Pope Leo XIII